In transportation, collision avoidance is the maintenance of systems and practices designed to prevent vehicles (such as aircraft, motor vehicles, ships, cranes and trains) from colliding with each other. Examples include:
 Airborne collision avoidance systems for aircraft
 Automatic Identification System for collision avoidance in water transport
 Collision avoidance (spacecraft)
 Collision avoidance system in automobiles
 Positive train control
 Tower Crane Anti-Collision Systems

See also 
 Contention (telecommunications)

References 

Collision